Ruth Cameron FInstP FIOM3 is a British materials scientist and professor at the University of Cambridge. She is co-director of the Cambridge Centre for Medical Materials. She studies materials that interact therapeutically with the body.

Early life and education 
Cameron completed her PhD in physics at the University of Cambridge.

Research and career 
Cameron's research considers materials which interact therapeutically with the body. She is interested in musculoskeletal repair. Her research considers bioactive biodegradable composites, biodegradable polymers, tissue engineered scaffold and surface patterning. Cameron works with Serena Best on collagen scaffolds for the spin-out company Orthomimetics.

In 1993 she joined the  Department of Materials Science and Metallurgy, University of Cambridge. Since 2006 she has co-led the Cambridge Centre for Medical Materials with Serena Best. The co-management makes Cameron and Best the first Engineering and Physical Sciences Research Council fellowship to job share. She was a founder member of the Pfizer Institute for Pharmaceutical Materials Science. She is a Fellow of Lucy Cavendish College, Cambridge.

Honours and awards 

 2017 - United Kingdom Society for Biomaterials President's Prize
 2017 - Institute of Materials, Minerals and Mining Griffith Medal & Prize
 2019 - Institute of Physics Rosalind Franklin Medal and Prize, for "innovative application of physics to regenerative medicine and pharmaceutical delivery"
2021 - Engineering and Physical Sciences Suffrage Science award

References 

Living people
Alumni of the University of Cambridge
Academics of the University of Cambridge
British materials scientists
British women academics
Fellows of Lucy Cavendish College, Cambridge
Fellows of the Institute of Physics
Year of birth missing (living people)
Place of birth missing (living people)
Women materials scientists and engineers
Fellows of the Institute of Materials, Minerals and Mining